Glauberite is a monoclinic sodium calcium sulfate mineral with the formula Na2Ca(SO4)2.

It was first described in 1808 for material from the El Castellar Mine, Villarrubia de Santiago, Toledo, Castile-La Mancha, Spain. It was named for the extracted Glauber's salts after the German alchemist Johann Rudolf Glauber (1604–1668).

Glauberite often forms in continental and marine evaporite deposits, but may also form from hydrothermal deposits, as mineral sublimates deposited near fumaroles, in amygdules in basalt, and in nitrate deposits in arid climates. It occurs associated with halite, polyhalite, anhydrite, gypsum, thenardite, mirabilite, sassolite and blodite.

Because of its solubility, glauberite is often dissolved away from the crystal matrix leaving a distinctly shaped hollow cast. Its mineral composition is readily altered into other minerals as pseudomorphs. Gypsum pseudomorphs are common due to increased humidity.

Glauberite, its cast impressions, and its pseudomorphed crystals are often easily recognizable due to its common crystal twinning, and crystal habit displayed by uniquely shaped flattened, often seeming rhombohedral, large individual 'floater crystals'.

The mineral is commercially mined for its sulfate contents.

References

Sodium minerals
Calcium minerals
Sulfate minerals
Monoclinic minerals
Minerals in space group 15
Evaporite